Laindon High Road School (formerly Laindon High Road County Secondary Modern) was a school located in Laindon, Essex. The school closed in 1998.

References

Borough of Basildon
Defunct schools in Essex
Educational institutions disestablished in 1998
1998 disestablishments in England